Communications in Theoretical Physics (CTP) is a peer reviewed academic journal published by the Chinese Physical Society along with the Institute of Theoretical Physics of the Chinese Academy of Sciences hosted by IOP Publishing. CTP reports on new theoretical developments in physics and its crossover with other interdisciplinary fields. The first volume was published in 1982 and it currently has an impact factor of 1.066 (2018). CTP is published monthly in English and it is currently edited by Zhu Bang-Fen of Tsinghua University.

External links
 Communications in Theoretical Physics IOP Publishing website
 Communications in Theoretical Physics Institute of Theoretical Physics, Chinese Academy of Sciences website

Physics journals
Chemistry journals
English-language journals
IOP Publishing academic journals
Publications established in 1982
Chinese Physical Society academic journals
Monthly journals